Sexual Health and Compulsivity is a peer-reviewed, academic journal. This journal is a key source for providing practicing clinicians useful and innovative strategies for intervention and treatment of sexual behaviors which includes problematic/compulsive sexual behaviors. It aims to expand our knowledge of sexual health with a particular focus on understanding problematic/compulsive sexual behaviors across diverse clinical and non-clinical populations. The journal covers a broad perspective of sexual health with a strong focus on compulsive sexual behaviors and their co-occurrence with other addictive and mental health disorders in clinical and non-clinical populations. Furthermore, the journal will cover topics ranging from behavioral, epidemiological, and neurobiological methods used to assess factors that contribute to the development and treatment of sexual behaviors including compulsive sexual behaviors (often known as sexual addiction, sexual compulsivity, and hypersexuality).

It is an official journal of the Society for the Advancement of Sexual Health and is edited by Shane W Kraus, PhD.

References

External links 
 Official Site for Sexual Addiction and Compulsivity
 Official Site of the Society for the Advancement of Sexual Health

Sexology journals
Sexual addiction